Pardon Mon Affaire (French title: Un éléphant ça trompe énormément, in English literally An Elephant Can Be Extremely Deceptive), is a 1976 French comedy film co-written and directed by Yves Robert. It was remade as the 1984 American film The Woman in Red.

The original title contains a pun in French. The word "trompe" means both "the (elephant's) trunk" and "to cheat" (in the sexual/romantic sense). The movie is about a married man's desire to have an affair with a model he just met. The film was followed by a sequel, Pardon Mon Affaire, Too!, in 1977.

Plot
In Paris, four men in their forties meet to play tennis and socialise. Two are married with children: Étienne, a senior civil servant, fantasises but stays faithful, while Bouly is a serial womaniser whose wife keeps leaving him. The other two are unmarried: Simon, a hypochondriac doctor, lives with his overbearing Jewish mother, while Daniel, a car salesman, secretly lives with another man.

In the car park under his office one morning, Étienne sees a beautiful woman walk over a grating when, like Marilyn Monroe, a blast of air sends her dress over her head. This is the woman of his dreams, who he sets out to pursue. A photographic model called Charlotte, she is amused at his attentions and does not discourage him too ferociously. She makes a date to meet him in London, where she is on an assignment, but his plane is diverted by fog.

Back in Paris, Charlotte agrees to go with Étienne to see his godmother, to whom he is devoted. There they find his three friends, his children, and his wife, who have all gathered secretly to welcome him. Daniel, with great aplomb, pretends that Charlotte is his girl friend and takes her home. Returning, he whispers her address to Étienne, who did not know it. Étienne goes there, and the two at last consummate their attraction.

In the morning the phone rings and Charlotte's husband tells her he will be home in a few minutes. She pushes Étienne, wearing just a dressing gown, out of the window onto a ledge. After she makes love with her husband, the couple leave and Étienne remains trapped, seven storeys above the Champs-Élysées. A crowd gathers, the fire brigade are called, and a TV crew films the rescue, which is watched by his wife and children as they eat their breakfast.

Cast
 Jean Rochefort: Étienne
 Claude Brasseur: Daniel
 Guy Bedos: Simon
 Victor Lanoux: Bouly
 Danièle Delorme: Marthe Dorsay
 Anny Duperey: Charlotte
 Marthe Villalonga: Mouchy Messina
 Maurice Bénichou: Gonthier
 Christophe Bourseiller: Lucien
 Martine Sarcey: Esperanza
 Anémone: The concierge

Awards and nominations
César Awards (France)
Won: Best Actor – Supporting Role (Claude Brasseur)
Nominated: Best Actress – Supporting Role (Anny Duperey)
Nominated: Best Writing (Jean-Loup Dabadie)
Golden Globe Awards (USA)
Nominated: Best Foreign Film

See also
 Pardon Mon Affaire, Too!
 The Woman in Red (1984 film)

References

External links
 

1976 films
1970s French-language films
French romantic comedy films
Films directed by Yves Robert
Films featuring a Best Supporting Actor César Award-winning performance
1976 romantic comedy films
Adultery in films
Films with screenplays by Jean-Loup Dabadie
Films scored by Vladimir Cosma
Midlife crisis films
1970s French films